Lesjak is a surname. Notable people with the surname include:

 Catherine A. Lesjak, American business executive
 Damir Lesjak (born 1967), Croatian footballer
 Lucija Lesjak, Croatian karateka
 Urban Lesjak (born 1990), Slovenian handball player
 Zoran Lesjak (born 1988), Croatian football player

Croatian surnames
Slovene-language surnames